Charles Waring Darwin may refer to:

 Charles Waring Darwin (British Army officer) (1855–1928), British soldier and landowner
 Charles Waring Darwin (infant) (1856–1858), son of the naturalist Charles Darwin

See also
Charles Darwin (disambiguation)
 Darwin (disambiguation)